Laurel Fork Wilderness may refer to two Wilderness areas in Monongahela National Forest:
Laurel Fork North Wilderness
Laurel Fork South Wilderness